CBASIC is a compiled version of the BASIC programming language written for the CP/M operating system by Gordon Eubanks in 1976–1977. It is an enhanced version of BASIC-E.

History
BASIC-E was Eubank's master's thesis project.  It was developed in PL/M by Eubanks for Gary Kildall's new CP/M operating system while both men were at the Naval Postgraduate School in Monterey, California.  BASIC-E was based on a BASIC compiler originally written by Gary Kildall in 1974.

Because it was developed at public expense, BASIC-E is in the public domain and could not be marketed exclusively. Seymour Rubinstein, the marketing director of IMSAI contacted Eubanks and asked him to create a saleable version under contract for the IMSAI 8080 microcomputer. Eubanks developed CBASIC in his spare time while he was still a naval officer stationed on the submarine USS George Washington at Vallejo, California. He retained joint ownership of the program with IMSAI, and sold the program through his own company, Compiler Systems, until it was acquired by Digital Research in 1981.

 CBASIC COMPILER VER 2.07
 CRUN VER 2.38 / COPYRIGHT 1981 COMPILER SYSTEMS INC.

Features
BASIC-E and early versions of CBASIC compiled source code into an intermediate p-code file, which was then executed by a separate run-time interpreter program. CBASIC could execute in a minimum of 24 KB of memory.  Line numbers in the program source were optional, unless needed as a label for a program jump. CBASIC proved very popular because it incorporated 14-digit binary-coded decimal (BCD) math which eliminated MBASIC's rounding errors that were sometimes troublesome for accounting.

CBASIC2 adds the following features:

 Integer variables
 Chaining with common variables
 Additional pre-defined functions
 Cross reference capability

Reception
InfoWorld in 1980 described CBASIC as the "primary language for the development of commercial CP/M applications", because of developers' widespread familiarity with BASIC and ability to distribute royalty-free binaries without source code to CBASIC owners. The magazine stated that the language had become popular "despite serious drawbacks", including the required preprocessor for interpreted source code making debugging difficult, slow speed, and incompatible changes. Jerry Pournelle said in May 1983 that Digital Research had "practically ruin[ed]" Eubanks' CBASIC manual after acquiring his company, but that the new edition was much better.

References

External links
 Gordon Eubanks own story of BASIC-E and CBASIC, Computer World oral history transcript, November 2000
 BASIC-E Reference Manual (December 1976)
 CBASIC 2 Reference Manual (Table of contents on p. 115) November 1981
 Another CBASIC description
 

 cbc – a CBASIC to C converter
 Interpreter in 6502 assembler
 CBASIC 2.8 = CBASIC-86 1.00 Posting by Emmanuel Roche

BASIC interpreters
BASIC compilers
CP/M software
Programming languages created in 1977
BASIC programming language family